Kahin-Zarabaon is a town in western Ivory Coast. It is a sub-prefecture of Bangolo Department in Guémon Region, Montagnes District.

Kahin-Zarabaon was a commune until March 2012, when it became one of 1126 communes nationwide that were abolished.

In 2021, the population of the sub-prefecture of Kahin-Zarabaon was 59,759.

Villages
The 7 villages of the sub-prefecture of Kahin-Zarabaon and their population in 2014 are:
 Banguiéhi (7 348)
 Gloubly (4 464)
 Kahin-Zarabaon (25 450)
 Koulouan (6 006)
 Péhê-Zarabaon (3 513)
 Pinhou (9 372)
 Tié-Iné Zarabaon (6 302)

Notes

Sub-prefectures of Guémon
Former communes of Ivory Coast